Tontowi Ahmad (born 18 July 1987) is a retired Indonesian badminton player. He plays for PB. Djarum, a badminton club in Kudus, Central Java and joined the club in 2005. Tontowi Ahmad rose to prominence in the world badminton in 2010 when he paired with the established mixed doubles star Liliyana Natsir. With Natsir he won the 2016 Olympic gold medal in the mixed doubles category.

Career

Olympic Games 
Ahmad made his debut at the Olympic Games in 2012 London. He competed in the mixed doubles event with partner Liliyana Natsir and finished fourth.

Ahmad made his second appearances at the Olympic Games in 2016 Rio. Paired with Liliyana Natsir, the duo won the gold medal at the end after beating Chan Peng Soon and Goh Liu Ying of Malaysia. Ahmad and Natsir won all of their matches in straight sets, including against the current no. 1-ranked Zhang Nan and Zhao Yunlei.

Awards

Achievements

Olympic Games 
Mixed doubles

BWF World Championships 
Mixed doubles

Asian Games 
Mixed doubles

Asian Championships 
Mixed doubles

Southeast Asian Games 
Mixed doubles

BWF World Tour (1 title, 3 runners-up) 
The BWF World Tour, which was announced on 19 March 2017 and implemented in 2018, is a series of elite badminton tournaments sanctioned by the Badminton World Federation (BWF). The BWF World Tour is divided into levels of World Tour Finals, Super 1000, Super 750, Super 500, Super 300 (part of the HSBC World Tour), and the BWF Tour Super 100.

Mixed doubles

BWF Superseries (16 titles, 8 runners-up) 
The BWF Superseries, which was launched on 14 December 2006 and implemented in 2007, is a series of elite badminton tournaments, sanctioned by the Badminton World Federation (BWF). BWF Superseries levels are Superseries and Superseries Premier. A season of Superseries consists of twelve tournaments around the world that have been introduced since 2011. Successful players are invited to the Superseries Finals, which are held at the end of each year.

Mixed doubles

  BWF Superseries Finals tournament
  BWF Superseries Premier tournament
  BWF Superseries tournament

BWF Grand Prix (10 titles, 3 runners-up) 
The BWF Grand Prix had two levels, the BWF Grand Prix and Grand Prix Gold. It was a series of badminton tournaments sanctioned by the Badminton World Federation (BWF) which was held from 2007 to 2017.

Mixed doubles

  BWF Grand Prix Gold tournament
  BWF Grand Prix tournament

BWF International Challenge/Series/Satellite (3 titles, 3 runners-up) 
Mixed doubles

  BWF International Challenge tournament
  BWF International Series tournament

Performance timeline

National team 
 Junior level

 Senior level

Individual competitions 
 Senior level

Record against selected opponents 
Mixed doubles results with Liliyana Natsir against Super Series finalists, Worlds Semi-finalists, and Olympic quarterfinalists.

  Chai Biao & Tang Jinhua 1–0
  He Hanbin & Bao Yixin 3–0
  Liu Cheng & Bao Yixin 5–2
  Qiu Zihan & Bao Yixin 1–0
  Xu Chen & Ma Jin 9-10
  Xu Chen & Yu Yang 0-1
  Zhang Nan & Zhao Yunlei 6–13
  Zhang Nan & Tang Jinhua 0–1
  Zheng Siwei & Chen Qingchen 3–2
  Zheng Siwei & Huang Yaqiong 1–4
  Chen Hung-ling & Cheng Wen-hsing 5–1
  Lee Sheng-mu & Chien Yu-chin 1–0
  Joachim Fischer Nielsen & Christinna Pedersen 4–6
  Mads Pieler Kolding & Kamilla Rytter Juhl 4–0
  Thomas Laybourn & Kamilla Rytter Juhl 3–1
 / Chris Adcock & Imogen Bankier 1–2
  Chris Adcock & Gabby Adcock 9–4
 / Robert Blair & Gabby Adcock 2–0
  Michael Fuchs & Birgit Michels 5–2
  Lee Chun Hei & Chau Hoi Wah 4–1
  Valiyaveetil Diju & Jwala Gutta 2–0
  Fran Kurniawan & Pia Zebadiah Bernadet 4–0
  Hendra Aprida Gunawan & Vita Marissa 1–1
  Nova Widianto & Vita Marissa 1–1
  Praveen Jordan & Debby Susanto 4-1
  Praveen Jordan & Vita Marissa 1–1
  Riky Widianto & Richi Puspita Dili 2–0
  Kenichi Hayakawa & Misaki Matsutomo 5–0
  Keigo Sonoda & Naoko Fukuman 3–1
  Ko Sung-hyun & Kim Ha-na 3–4
  Lee Yong-dae & Lee Hyo-jung 1–0
  Lee Yong-dae & Ha Jung-eun 5–4
  Lee Yong-dae & Shin Seung-chan 1–0
  Shin Baek-cheol & Jang Ye-na 4–0
  Yoo Yeon-seong & Eom Hye-won 1–0
  Yoo Yeon-seong & Jang Ye-na 1–0
  Chan Peng Soon & Goh Liu Ying 11–1
  Robert Mateusiak & Nadieżda Zięba 2–0
  Songphon Anugritayawon & Kunchala Voravichitchaikul 2–0
  Sudket Prapakamol & Saralee Thungthongkam 4–3

References

External links 

 
 
 

1987 births
Living people
People from Banyumas Regency
Sportspeople from Central Java
Indonesian male badminton players
Badminton players at the 2012 Summer Olympics
Badminton players at the 2016 Summer Olympics
Olympic badminton players of Indonesia
Olympic gold medalists for Indonesia
Olympic medalists in badminton
Medalists at the 2016 Summer Olympics
Badminton players at the 2010 Asian Games
Badminton players at the 2014 Asian Games
Badminton players at the 2018 Asian Games
Asian Games silver medalists for Indonesia
Asian Games bronze medalists for Indonesia
Asian Games medalists in badminton
Medalists at the 2010 Asian Games
Medalists at the 2014 Asian Games
Medalists at the 2018 Asian Games
Competitors at the 2011 Southeast Asian Games
Southeast Asian Games gold medalists for Indonesia
Southeast Asian Games medalists in badminton
Universiade bronze medalists for Indonesia
Universiade medalists in badminton
Medalists at the 2007 Summer Universiade
World No. 1 badminton players
21st-century Indonesian people
20th-century Indonesian people